Pararistolochia australopithecurus, synonym Pararistolochia australopithecurus, is an Australian plant in the Aristolochiaceae or birthwort family, native to Queensland. It is a rainforest vine and the host plant for the Cairns birdwing butterfly and the red-bodied swallowtail. Found in the area around Mount Bellenden Ker of north Queensland. Between the Little Mulgrave River and the South Johnstone River.

References

australopithecurus
Flora of Queensland
Plants described in 1996